Anthony Harvey (born 25 May 1973) is a former Australian rules footballer who played with St Kilda in the Australian Football League (AFL) and Norwood in the South Australian National Football League (SANFL).

Harvey comes from a famous sporting family with his grandfather Merv Harvey and granduncle Neil Harvey both being Australian Test cricket representatives. His brother Robert is St Kilda's games record holder.

A midfielder, Harvey was recruited to St Kilda from Frankston and his four AFL appearances consisted of just one win, against Fitzroy at Waverley Park. His best performance came in the last of those games, when he kicked his only career goal and managed 23 disposals against that year's Grand Final runners-up Geelong.

The next chapter of his football career was spent in South Australia where he played for Norwood, which he captained to the 1997 premiership when regular skipper Garry McIntosh was unavailable due to a suspension. Harvey again captained Norwood for part of the 1998 season, the same year which he won his club's 'Best and Fairest'. After McIntosh retired he was appointed to the captaincy full-time in 1999, a role he would keep through to the end of the 2001 season. His stint included the losing SANFL Grand Final team of 1999.

See also 
Harvey family

References

Holmesby, Russell and Main, Jim (2007). The Encyclopedia of AFL Footballers. 7th ed. Melbourne: Bas Publishing.

1973 births
Living people
Australian rules footballers from Victoria (Australia)
St Kilda Football Club players
Norwood Football Club players
Frankston Football Club players
Anthony